Abanaka is an unincorporated community in Van Wert County, in the U.S. state of Ohio.

History
A post office called Abanaka was established in 1880, and remained in operation until 1906. Abanaka is a name derived from a Native American language meaning "easterner".

References

Unincorporated communities in Van Wert County, Ohio
Unincorporated communities in Ohio
1880 establishments in Ohio
Populated places established in 1880